Dorien Leon Wilson (born July 5, 1963) is an American actor known for his role as Professor Stanley Oglevee on the UPN sitcom The Parkers (the spin-off series of Moesha), which ran from 1999 to 2004, his recurring role as Terrence Winningham on the ABC/The WB sitcom Sister, Sister (from 1994 to 1996) and his supporting role as Eddie Charles on Dream On (from 1991 to 1996). Most recently, he has starred as Jay Weaver on the Bounce TV comedy sitcom In the Cut.

Early life 
Wilson was born on July 5, 1963, to his parents in Lompoc, California, and has two siblings, sister Savita Carothers and late brother, Jamont David Wilson, who died in 2015. Wilson developed an interest in acting while attending high school in Lompoc, California.

Career 
Wilson played the role of Professor Stanley Oglevee on the UPN sitcom The Parkers and as talk-show host Eddie Charles on HBO's series Dream On. He had a recurring role as Terrence on Sister, Sister. He also played Warrington Steele on The Steve Harvey Show and co-starred alongside Sherman Hemsley on the short-lived sitcom Goode Behavior.

He has appeared mostly in television roles but appeared in a few film roles as well. He co-starred in House Party 4: Down to the Last Minute in 2001 and had a bit part as a doctor in the 2004 film You Got Served.

Wilson appeared in Disney Channel's series That's So Raven as "Mad Money Mitch" with the Mighty Megamix, "Mad Miguel at Mid-night" on the Spanish Station, and "Mad Mountain Mitch" with the Good Ol' Country Hits. He appeared on The Fresh Prince of Bel-Air as Juggles the clown strapped with a bomb and holding Judge Banks hostage; he appeared on the sitcom Martin as a theatre producer; and he made a couple of appearances as a pastor on the sitcom Living Single. He also had an appearance in Tyler Perry's House of Payne as Cassi Davis' college love-interest.

Dorien was also Chandler's boss on the hit TV Show Friends. In the 1980s Dorien was a resident Actor of CTC—California Theatre Center—in Sunnyvale, CA. He was also an Acting Conservatory Teacher at CTC. After recognizing her former teacher—Dorien Wilson—on Friends & various other shows, one of his CTC students from the 1980s, Anita Fortner Jones, who played his daughter—Fezziwig Sister, among other roles—for 2 Seasons in the stage play of Charles Dickens' "A Christmas Carol," created the Dorien Wilson Fan Club.  He has also appeared in a KFC commercial for boneless chicken.

Filmography

Film

Television

References

External links 
 

1963 births
Living people
African-American male actors
American male television actors
People from Lompoc, California
Male actors from California
21st-century African-American people
20th-century African-American people